Joël Hauvieux (born 20 January 1949) is a French former professional racing cyclist. He rode in two editions of the Tour de France. He finished the 1976 edition in 70th place and was given the Combativity award after stage 4. His sporting career began with La Hutte-Gitane.

References

External links
 

1949 births
Living people
French male cyclists
Sportspeople from Sarthe
Cyclists from Pays de la Loire